{{Infobox person
| name        = Richard Crouse
| image       = Richard_Crouse_Blue_Suit_2020.jpg
| alt         = 
| caption     = Crouse in 2019
| birth_name  = 
| birth_date  = 
| birth_place = Bridgewater, Nova Scotia
| death_date  = 
| death_place = 
| nationality = Canadian
| other_names = 
| occupation  = film critic, radio and television broadcaster, author
| known_for   = Reel to Real, The 100 Best Movies You've Never Seen, Pop Life.
}}

Richard Crouse (born May 26, 1963) is a Canadian film critic for CTV News Channel and CP24.

Life and career

He was the film critic for Canada AM from 2005 until the show's cancellation in 2016. He hosted In Short on Bravo, was the host of Reel to Real from 1998 to 2008, and was a regular pundit for Star TV's Best! Movies! Ever! and the host of The 100 Best Movies You've Never Seen on Rogers Television.

In September 2017 his late night talk show Pop Life began airing on CTV, CTV News Channel and Bravo.

Books
He is also the author of several books on film and pop culture history including Big Bang, Baby, The 100 Best Movies You've Never Seen, Son of the 100 Best Movies You've Never Seen and Rock and Roll Toronto: From Alanis to Zeppelin''.

References

External links
 Official Site
 

1963 births
Canadian film critics
Canadian talk radio hosts
Canadian television hosts
Living people
People from Bridgewater, Nova Scotia
20th-century Canadian non-fiction writers
20th-century Canadian male writers
21st-century Canadian non-fiction writers
21st-century Canadian male writers
Canadian male non-fiction writers
Writers from Nova Scotia